U Sports men's ice hockey is the highest level of play of men's ice hockey at the university level under the auspices of U Sports, Canada's governing body for university sports. As these players compete at the university level, they are obligated to follow the rule of standard eligibility of five years.

University hockey teams in Canada compete in leagues as part of U Sports, the national governing body for Canadian university athletics. (In Canadian English, the term "college" is reserved for schools that would be called "junior", "community", or "technical" colleges in the U.S.  Such schools' athletics programs are overseen by the Canadian Collegiate Athletic Association.) U Sports sponsors both men's and women's hockey. Like in the United States, teams compete in athletic conferences based on geographical locations of the schools. Individual conferences hold postseason tournaments, followed by the round-robin U Sports Championship tournament in late March.

History

The Canadian Intercollegiate Athletic Union was established in 1961 by Major W.J. McLeod, Athletic Director of the Royal Military College of Canada.  By the 1962-63 season, the CIAU had created a National Championship for their ice hockey playoffs: the David Johnston University Cup.

The first ever national championship was competed for in Kingston, Ontario between the UBC Thunderbirds and the McMaster Marlins. The Marlins won the game 3-2.

The CIAU had competition in Canadian post-secondary varsity hockey at a national level, but rivalries only existed on an exhibition basis.  The Canadian Colleges Athletic Association, now Canadian Collegiate Athletic Association, held national championships between 1975 and 2001.  At one time, seven conferences in the CCAA sanctioned hockey, but only two do today — the Alberta Colleges Athletic Conference and the Quebec Student Sport Federation (now known by its French initialism of RSEQ).

In 1978, the governing body of the league changed its name to the Canadian Interuniversity Athletics Union.  The body's name was changed in 2001 to Canadian Interuniversity Sport, and most recently in 2016, to the current U Sports.

The most successful team in U Sports history is the Alberta Golden Bears with 16 David Johnston University Cup titles, winning 28% of all championships awarded to date. This is followed by the Toronto Varsity Blues with 10 (last in 1984) and the UNB Reds with 8 (last in 2019). The reigning champions are the UNB Reds, who defeated the Alberta Golden Bears 4-2 in Lethbridge, Alberta in March 2019.

On April 4, 2016, St. Thomas University announced the discontinuation of their men's hockey program, reducing the teams participating in the Atlantic University Sport (AUS) conference to seven. 

On August 12, 2016, Kori Cheverie was announced as an assistant coach for the Ryerson Rams men’s ice hockey team, making her the first female full-time assistant coach in U Sports men’s hockey history.

The MacEwan Griffins and Trinity Western Spartans joined the Canada West conference beginning with the 2020-21 season. However, the Lethbridge Pronghorns announced the discontinuation of their hockey programs following the 2019-20 season due to budgetary constraints. Furthermore, following the cancellation of the 2020–21 season, the Laurentian Voyageurs discontinued their men's ice hockey program in 2021 leaving U Sports with 35 men's ice hockey teams.

Teams

Atlantic University Sport
Acadia Axemen
Dalhousie Tigers
Moncton Aigles Bleus
St. Francis Xavier X-Men
Saint Mary's Huskies
UNB Reds
UPEI Panthers

Canada West Universities Athletic Association
Alberta Golden Bears
Calgary Dinos
MacEwan Griffins
Manitoba Bisons
Mount Royal Cougars
Regina Cougars
Saskatchewan Huskies
Trinity Western Spartans
UBC Thunderbirds

Ontario University Athletics

East
Carleton Ravens
Concordia Stingers
McGill Redbirds
Nipissing Lakers
Ottawa Gee-Gees
Queen's Golden Gaels
RMC Paladins
Ontario Tech Ridgebacks
UQTR Patriotes

West

Brock Badgers
Guelph Gryphons
Lakehead Thunderwolves
Ryerson Rams
Toronto Varsity Blues
Waterloo Warriors
Western Mustangs
Wilfrid Laurier Golden Hawks
Windsor Lancers
York Lions

Annual awards
The following are annual U Sports trophies and awards:
David Johnston University Cup - Awarded annually to the U Sports men's ice hockey champions
Senator Joseph A. Sullivan Trophy – Annual "Player of the Year" awarded to the most outstanding player in U Sports. 
U Sports Defenceman of the Year -  Awarded annually to the most outstanding defenceman in U Sports.
U Sports Goaltender of the Year – Awarded annually to the most outstanding goaltender in U Sports.
Clare Drake Award - Annual "Rookie of the Year" award presented to "the most outstanding first-year player in U Sports who has exhibited exemplary skill and leadership".
R.W. Pugh Award – Awarded annually to the most sportsmanlike player in U Sports.
Dr. Randy Gregg Award - Awarded annually to reward excellence in the student-athlete. The player who receives this award has exhibited outstanding achievement in ice hockey, academics, and community involvement.
Father George Kehoe Memorial Award – Coach of the Year award.
U Sports All-Canadian Teams - Each year U Sports names a "First Team", "Second Team", and "All-Rookie Team".

Champions

References

External links
 

 
Ice hockey leagues in Canada